Cats: Highlights from the Motion Picture Soundtrack is the soundtrack album to the 2019 film Cats. The album was released through Polydor Records and in the US on Republic Records on December 20, 2019. The music for the film was composed by Andrew Lloyd Webber. The song "Beautiful Ghosts" by Taylor Swift, the first   promotional single from the soundtrack album, was released on November 15, 2019. The song was nominated for Best Original Song at the 77th Golden Globe Awards and Best Song Written for Visual Media at the 63rd Annual Grammy Awards. The soundtrack also features contributions from Jason Derulo, Jennifer Hudson, James Corden, Idris Elba, Ian McKellen and various artists.

Track listing
Credits adapted from iTunes, Apple Music, Spotify, Tidal, and Amazon Music.

Charts

References

2019 soundtrack albums
Cats (musical)
Musical film soundtracks
Republic Records soundtracks
Polydor Records soundtracks